Quiambaug is an area of Stonington, Connecticut, consisting primarily of the valley of the Mistuxet Brook and Quiambaug Cove, and comprising roughly one-sixth of the town.

One of the first four settlers of Stonington, Thomas Miner, built his house in Quiambaug in 1653.  His diary of life there in the 17th century.  The entries for 1668 are available at http://historymatters.gmu.edu/d/6228An.

Quiambaug Cove was one of the largest producing area of commercial oysters in Connecticut in 1900.

Notable residents have included the sailor Nathaniel Fanning and explorer Edmund Fanning, FBI Director L. Patrick Gray, artist Ellery Thompson, and writer L. Rust Hills.

The Quiambaug valley includes the Quiambaug Fire District and the Quiambaug Volunteer Fire Department.

References

"History of the Town of Stonington, County of New London, Connecticut, from its First Settlement in 1649 to 1900, with a Genealogical Register of Stonington Families", by Richard Anson Wheeler
"Stonington By The Sea", by Henry Robinson Palmer
"An Environmental History Review of Oyster, Flounder, Bay Scallop and Smelt Fisheries", Timothy C. Visel

External links
Quiambaug/Mistuxet history

Populated places in New London County, Connecticut
1653 establishments in Connecticut